Kuchinarai is a district (amphoe) in the eastern part of Kalasin province, northeastern Thailand.

Geography
Neighboring districts are (from the west clockwise): Don Chan, Na Mon, Huai Phueng, Na Khu, and Khao Wong of Kalasin Province; Khamcha-i and Nong Sung of Mukdahan province; Moei Wadi, Phon Thong, and Pho Chai of Roi Et province.

Economy
A traditional sugarcane product that used to be common in Thailand is now made only in this district, and specifically, in Lao Hai Ngam Subdistrict. It is called 'sugarcane cake' or 'sugar cake'. It is made from indigenous cane grown for more than eight months. Rice farmers produce it as a secondary money-earner. The sugar cakes are made only in February and are quickly bought up and disappear from the market until the following year.

Administration
The district is divided into 12 sub-districts (tambons), which are further subdivided into 142 villages (mubans). There are two sub-district municipalities (thesaban tambon): Bua Khao and Kut Wa, each covering parts of the same-named tambon. There are a further 12 tambon administrative organizations (TAO).

References

External links
amphoe.com (Thai)

Kuchinarai